Terry Pierce (born June 21, 1981 in Fort Worth, Texas) is a former American football linebacker of the National Football League. He was originally drafted by the Denver Broncos in the second round of the 2003 NFL Draft. He played college football at Kansas State.

High school 
Pierce attended Western Hills High School in Benbrook, Texas.

College career
Pierce first came to Kansas State University and was redshirted. He played in all but one game in 2000, including the Cotton Bowl Classic. After racking up 38 tackles (six for a loss) and three pass break-ups, he was named the Big 12 Defensive Freshman of the Year.

In 10 starts in 2001, Pierce recorded 68 tackles and three sacks while earning Academic All-Big 12 honors. His junior season, he posted 104 tackles and five sacks. He subsequently declared for the NFL Draft with a year of college eligibility remaining.

Professional career

Pierce was chosen by the Denver Broncos in the second round (51st overall) in the 2003 NFL Draft. On July 25, he signed a four-year, $2.7 million contract that included a $1.32 million signing bonus.

During his rookie season in 2004, Pierce was inactive for the first seven games of the regular season. He made his NFL debut on October 26 against the Baltimore Ravens, but did not record any statistics. The following week, he posted three tackles (two solo) against the New England Patriots. On November 16, Pierce suffered a torn pectoral muscle and was subsequently placed on injured reserve, ending his season.

In 2004, Pierce was to battle Donnie Spragan and Jashon Sykes for the starting strong-side linebacker job. However, Pierce suffered a sprained medial collateral ligament in August, losing his chance at the job. He was able to recover in time for the regular season opener, but played primarily on special teams during the season and recorded just five tackles in 15 games.

Pierce was moved from inside to outside linebacker in the 2005 offseason, and worked there throughout the preseason. However, he was waived on September 3 at the conclusion of the preseason. He worked out for the Seattle Seahawks and Dallas Cowboys on separate occasions in October 2005, but was not signed.

On January 18, 2006 the Houston Texans signed Pierce to a future contract. However, he was released on July 14 before training camp began.

References

1981 births
Living people
People from Fort Worth, Texas
American football linebackers
Kansas State Wildcats football players
Denver Broncos players
Houston Texans players